At Full Gallop (and also known as In Full Gallop) is a 1996 Polish biographical tragicomedy film written and directed by Krzysztof Zanussi, starring Maja Komorowska, Bartosz Obuchowicz, Karolina Wajda, Piotr Adamczyk, Piotr Szwedes, Andrzej Szenajch, with Halina Gryglaszewska, Sławomira Łozińska, Stanisława Celińska, Krystyna Bigelmajer, Agnieszka Warchulska, Grzegorz Warchoł, Jan Prochyra, Stephen Kember, Eugeniusz Priwiezieńcew, Lew Rywin, and Mario Di Nardo in supporting roles. Zanussi has described the film as his most autobiographical work. It was screened in the Un Certain Regard section at the 1996 Cannes Film Festival. The film was selected as the Polish entry for the Best Foreign Language Film at the 69th Academy Awards, but was not accepted as a nominee.

Plot
A young boy in post-World War II, Communist-dominated Poland, whose father's decision to remain in the United Kingdom after the war has made his family politically-suspect with the local Party authorities, is sent by his mother to stay with an "aunt" (in reality an old family friend) in the capital, Warsaw. Ida is a strong-willed, single, middle-aged woman who has found her own ways of surviving in the Communist-run society (which sometimes involves her charming powerful older men, as well as maintaining two different sets of identity papers). She gets Hubert admitted to one of the city's best schools by portraying him as the orphan of a war hero. But she also shares with him her own passion for horses, at a time when riding is seen by many officials as a relic of the old aristocratic class. Hubert himself, meanwhile, struggles to understand how it can be right for a good Catholic to lie in order to survive under Communism.

Cast
 Maja Komorowska as Aunt Idalia Dobrowolska
 Bartosz Obuchowicz as Hubert
 Karolina Wajda as Rozmaryna
 Piotr Adamczyk as Ksawery
 Piotr Szwedes as Dominik
 Andrzej Szenajch as cavalry captain
 Halina Gryglaszewska as Idalia's aunt
 Sławomira Łozińska as Hubert's mother
 Stanisława Celińska as Justyna Winewar (minister's wife)
 Krystyna Bigelmajer as teacher
 Agnieszka Warchulska as headteacher
 Grzegorz Warchoł as LZS director
 Jan Prochyra as UB officer interrogating Hubert's mother
 Stephen Kember as British diplomat
 Eugeniusz Priwiezieńcew as public prosecutor
 Lew Rywin as minister
 Mario Di Nardo as Italian diplomat

Filming
The film was mostly shot in Czerwińsk nad Wisłą and Łąck.

See also
 List of submissions to the 69th Academy Awards for Best Foreign Language Film
 List of Polish submissions for the Academy Award for Best International Feature Film

References

External links

1990s biographical drama films
1990s political comedy-drama films
1996 comedy-drama films
1996 films
Biographical films about children
Polish biographical drama films
Polish comedy-drama films
Polish historical films
1990s Polish-language films
Films about horses
Films about Soviet repression
Films directed by Krzysztof Zanussi
Films scored by Wojciech Kilar
Films set in the 1950s
Films set in Warsaw
Films shot in Poland
Self-reflexive films
Stalinism in Poland
Tragicomedy films